Jessieville School District is a school district in Garland County and Saline County. It includes sections of Hot Springs Village.

References

External links
 

Education in Garland County, Arkansas
Education in Saline County, Arkansas
School districts in Arkansas